Mr and Mrs is a British television game show that aired on ITV, hosted most familiarly by Derek Batey and based on the Canadian show of the same title.

Format
Each couple attempted to match each spouse's answers to six questions concerning their domestic and love life. The couple would switch roles after the first three questions. For each set of three questions, one spouse would attempt to predict how the other, seated behind a window and wearing headphones, would answer those questions. Any couple that successfully matched answers to all six questions would win a jackpot prize.

Broadcasting
The series was unusual in versions being made by more than one ITV region: Alan Taylor hosted the HTV version, Derek Batey hosted the version produced by Border and Norman Vaughan hosted a version made by Anglia. The first version for TWW began in 1964, with the Border version following in 1967. The Anglia version ran for one year (1969) across the ITV network, but it was not until 1972 that the series was regularly networked, with hosts Batey and Taylor alternating each week. In 1976 the Border version alone was transmitted nationally, and remained part of the daytime scheduling until 1988.

There was also a local version of the programme produced by Tyne Tees in 1976, shown on Sunday afternoons in summer and autumn. Tyne Tees had previously provided colour production facilities for Border in the early 1970s to produce their version as the latter had not yet upgraded to colour production.

It was then aired on UK Living and regionally on HTV, hosted by Nino Firetto and entitled The All-New Mr and Mrs Show, and then back on the ITV network in 1999 hosted by Julian Clary.

The show was part of an eight-episode series called Gameshow Marathon hosted by Vernon Kay and aired on 12 May 2007.

It was revived in 2008 as a celebrity game show entitled All Star Mr & Mrs, hosted by Phillip Schofield, originally with Fern Britton.

Transmissions

UK Living version

Carlton version

International versions
The show originated in Canada in 1963. The Canadian version was produced at CFTO-TV in Toronto and ran on the CTV network for 780 episodes, and was hosted by Peter Parker. Roy Ward Dickson was the show's creator.

The British version originated in Wales in 1964 as a Welsh language only programme in the same format entitled Sion a Sian, Sion a Siân or Siôn a Siân ("John and Jane") where it continued until 2003 presented by Ieuan Rhys. It was first broadcast on TWW, then HTV and finally S4C. The series was revived in 2012, presented by Stifyn Parri and Heledd Cynwal. That year saw Sion a Sian feature its first gay couple.

See also
 The Newlywed Game

References

3.: Independent Broadcasting Authority Annual Report and Accounts, 1976-1977, page 22 and 93.

External links

1960s British game shows
1970s British game shows
1980s British game shows
1990s British game shows
1965 British television series debuts
1999 British television series endings
ITV game shows
Television series by ITV Studios
English-language television shows
Television shows produced by Border Television
British television series revived after cancellation
Television game shows with incorrect disambiguation